Aconitic acid is an organic acid. The two isomers are cis-aconitic acid and trans-aconitic acid. The conjugate base of cis-aconitic acid, cis-aconitate is an intermediate in the isomerization of citrate to isocitrate in the citric acid cycle. It is acted upon by the enzyme aconitase.

Aconitic acid can be synthesized by dehydration of citric acid using sulfuric acid:
(HO2CCH2)2C(OH)CO2H  → HO2CCH=C(CO2H)CH2CO2H  +  H2O
A mixture of isomers are generated in this way.

It was first prepared by thermal dehydration.

References

Tricarboxylic acids
Enoic acids